Barbodes katolo is an extinct species of cyprinid fish endemic to Lake Lanao in Mindanao, the Philippines.  Males of this species reached a length of  SL while females only reached .

References

Barbodes
Freshwater fish of the Philippines
Endemic fauna of the Philippines
Fauna of Mindanao
Fish described in 1924